Apis (Ancient Greek: Ἄπις derived from apios "far-off" or "of the pear-tree") was a king of Argos in Greek mythology.

Family 
Apis was a son of Phoroneus by the nymph Teledice or Cinna or Cerdo, and brother of Niobe. In some accounts, he was the son of Phoroneus by his first wife Peitho ("Persuasion") and thus brother to Aegialeus. Yet, Apis' possible mother was also called Laodice or Perimede.

Reign 
During Apis' reign he established a tyrannical government and called the Peloponnesus after his own name Apia, but was eventually killed in a conspiracy headed by Thelxion, king of Sparta, and Telchis. In the former of these passages Apollodorus of Athens states that Apis, the son of Phoroneus, was killed by Aetolus; but this is a mistake arising from the confusion of this Apis with another Apis who was the son of Jason, who was killed by Aetolus during the funeral games celebrated in honor of Azanes. Argus Panoptes, a descendant of his sister Niobe, avenged his murder by putting Thelxion and Telchis to death.

Serapis 
Apis, the son of Phoroneus, is said, after his death, to have been worshiped as a god under the name of Serapis (Σάραπις). This confusion is still more manifest in the tradition, that Apis gave his kingdom of Argos to his brother, and went to Egypt, where he reigned for several years afterwards. Apis is spoken of as one of the earliest lawgivers among the Greeks. Both these stories show that Egyptian myths were mixed up with the story of Apis, see Apis (Egyptian mythology).

Notes

References 

 Pausanias, Description of Greece with an English Translation by W.H.S. Jones, Litt.D., and H.A. Ormerod, M.A., in 4 Volumes. Cambridge, MA, Harvard University Press; London, William Heinemann Ltd. 1918. Online version at the Perseus Digital Library
 Pausanias, Graeciae Descriptio. 3 vols. Leipzig, Teubner. 1903.  Greek text available at the Perseus Digital Library.
 Pseudo-Apollodorus, The Library with an English Translation by Sir James George Frazer, F.B.A., F.R.S. in 2 Volumes, Cambridge, MA, Harvard University Press; London, William Heinemann Ltd. 1921. Online version at the Perseus Digital Library. Greek text available from the same website.
 

Princes in Greek mythology
Kings of Argos
Inachids
Mythology of Argolis